In materials science, polymorphism describes the existence of a solid material in more than one form or crystal structure. Polymorphism is a form of isomerism. Any crystalline material can exhibit the phenomenon. Allotropy refers to polymorphism for chemical elements.  Polymorphism is of practical relevance to pharmaceuticals, agrochemicals, pigments, dyestuffs, foods, and explosives. According to IUPAC, a polymorphic transition is "A reversible transition of a solid crystalline phase at a certain temperature and pressure (the inversion point) to another phase of the same chemical composition with a different crystal structure." According to McCrone, polymorphs are "different in crystal structure but identical in the liquid or vapor states." Materials with two polymorphs are called dimorphic, with three polymorphs,  trimorphic, etc.

Examples
Many compounds exhibit polymorphism. It has been claimed that "every compound has different polymorphic forms, and that, in general, the number of forms known for a given compound is proportional to the time and money spent in research on that compound."

Organic compounds

Benzamide
The phenomenon was discovered in 1832 by Friedrich Wöhler and Justus von Liebig.  They observed that the silky needles of freshly crystallized benzamide slowly converted to rhombic crystals. Present-day analysis identifies three polymorphs for benzamide: the least stable one, formed by flash cooling is the orthorhombic form II. This type is followed by the monoclinic form III (observed by Wöhler/Liebig). The most stable form is monoclinic form I. The hydrogen bonding mechanisms are the same for all three phases; however, they differ strongly in their pi-pi interactions.

Maleic acid
In 2006 a new polymorph of maleic acid was discovered, fully 124 years after the first crystal form was studied. Maleic acid is manufactured on an industrial scale in the chemical industry. It forms salt found in medicine. The new crystal type is produced when a co-crystal of caffeine and maleic acid (2:1) is dissolved in chloroform and when the solvent is allowed to evaporate slowly. Whereas form I has monoclinic space group P21/c, the new form has space group Pc. Both polymorphs consist of sheets of molecules connected through hydrogen bonding of the carboxylic acid groups; but, in form I, the sheets alternate with respect of the net dipole moment, whereas, in form II, the sheets are oriented in the same direction.

1,3,5-Trinitrobenzene
After 125 years of study, 1,3,5-trinitrobenzene yielded a second polymorph. The usual form has the space group Pbca, but in 2004, a second polymorph was obtained in the space group Pca21 when the compound was crystallised in the presence of an additive, trisindane. This experiment shows that additives can induce the appearance of polymorphic forms.

Other organic compounds
Acridine has been obtained as eight polymorphs and aripiprazole has nine. The record for the largest number of well-characterised polymorphs is held by a compound known as ROY. Glycine crystallizes as both monoclinic and hexagonal crystals. Polymorphism in organic compounds is often the result of conformational polymorphism.

Inorganic compounds

Binary metal oxides
Polymorphism in binary metal oxides has attracted much attention because these materials are of significant economic value. One set of famous examples have the composition SiO2, which form many polymorphs.  Important ones include: α-quartz, β-quartz, tridymite, cristobalite, moganite, coesite, and stishovite.

Other inorganic materials
Classical examples of polymorphism are the pair of minerals calcite and aragonite, both forms of calcium carbonate. Perhaps the most famous example is that of the polymorphs of carbon: graphite and diamond.

β-HgS precipitates as a black solid when Hg(II) salts are treated with H2S.  With gentle heating of the slurry, the black polymorph converts to the red form.

Factors affecting polymorphism
According to Ostwald's rule, usually less stable polymorphs crystallize before the stable form.  The concept hinges on the idea that unstable polymorphs more closely resemble the state in solution, and thus are kinetically advantaged.  The founding case of fibrous vs rhombic  benzamide illustrates the case. Another example is provided by two polymorphs of titanium dioxide.

Polymorphs have disparate stabilities.  Some convert rapidly at room (or any) temperature. Most polymorphs of organic molecules only differ by a few kJ/mol in lattice energy. Approximately 50% of known polymorph pairs differ by less than 2 kJ/mol and stability differences of more than 10 kJ/mol are rare.

Polymorphism is affected by the details of crystallisation. The solvent in all respects affects the nature of the polymorph, including concentration, other components of the solvent, i.e., species that inhibiting or promote certain growth patterns. A decisive factor is often the temperature of the solvent from which crystallisation is carried out.

Metastable polymorphs are not always reproducibly obtained, leading to cases of "disappearing polymorphs".

In pharmaceuticals
Drugs receive regulatory approval for only a single polymorph. In a classic patent dispute, the GlaxoSmithKline defended its patent for the polymorph type II of the active ingredient in Zantac against competitors while that of the polymorph type I had already expired. Polymorphism in drugs can also have direct medical implications since dissolution rates depend on the polymorph. Polymorphic purity of drug samples can be checked using techniques such as powder X-ray diffraction, IR/Raman
spectroscopy, and utilizing the differences in their optical properties in some cases.

Case studies

Ritonavir
The antiviral drug ritonavir exists as two polymorphs, which differ greatly in efficacy. Such issues were solved by reformulating the medicine into gelcaps and tablets, rather than the original capsules.

Acetylsalicylic acid
A second polymorph of acetylsalicylic acid was reported only in 2005. A new crystal type was found after attempted co-crystallization of aspirin and levetiracetam from hot acetonitrile. In form I, pairs of aspirin molecules form centrosymmetric dimers through the acetyl groups with the (acidic) methyl proton to carbonyl hydrogen bonds. In form II, each aspirin molecule forms the same hydrogen bonds, but with two neighbouring molecules instead of one. With respect to the hydrogen bonds formed by the carboxylic acid groups, both polymorphs form identical dimer structures. The aspirin polymorphs contain identical 2-dimensional sections and are therefore more precisely described as polytypes.

Paracetamol
Paracetamol powder has poor compression properties, which poses difficulty in making tablets.  A second polymorph was found with more suitable compressive properties.

Cortisone acetate
Cortisone acetate exists in at least five different polymorphs, four of which are unstable in water and change to a stable form.

Carbamazepine
Carbamazepine, estrogen, paroxetine, and chloramphenicol also show polymorphism.

Polytypism 
Polytypes are a special case of polymorphs, where multiple close-packed crystal structures differ in one dimension only.  Polytypes have identical close-packed planes, but differ in the stacking sequence in the third dimension perpendicular to these planes. Silicon carbide (SiC) has more than 170 known polytypes, although most are rare.  All the polytypes of SiC have virtually the same density and Gibbs free energy. The most common SiC polytypes are shown in Table 1.

Table 1: Some polytypes of SiC.

A second group of materials with different polytypes are the transition metal dichalcogenides, layered materials such as molybdenum disulfide (MoS2). For these materials the polytypes have more distinct effects on material properties, e.g. for MoS2, the 1T polytype is metallic in character, while the 2H form is more semiconducting.
Another example is tantalum disulfide, where the common 1T as well as 2H polytypes occur, but also more complex 'mixed coordination' types such as 4Hb and 6R, where the trigonal prismatic and the octahedral geometry layers are mixed. Here, the 1T polytype exhibits a charge density wave, with distinct influence on the conductivity as a function of temperature, while the 2H polytype exhibits superconductivity.

ZnS and CdI2 are also polytypical. It has been suggested that this type of polymorphism is due to kinetics where screw dislocations rapidly reproduce partly disordered sequences in a periodic fashion.

Theory
In terms of thermodynamics, two types of polymorphic behaviour are recognized. For a monotropic system, plots of the free energies of the various polymorphs against temperature do not cross before all polymorphs melt. As a result any transition from one polymorph to another below the melting point will be irreversible. For an enantiotropic system, a plot of the free energy against temperature shows a crossing point before the various melting points. It may also be possible to convert interchangeably between the two polymorphs by heating or cooling, or through physical contact with a lower energy polymorph.

]

See also

 Isomorphism (crystallography)
 Dimorphism (Wiktionary)
 Polyamorphism

References

External links 
 "Small Molecule Crystallization" (PDF) at Illinois Institute of Technology website
 "SiC and Polytpism"

 
Mineralogy
Gemology
Crystallography